Luganville Airfield or Bomber Field #3 is a former World War II airfield on the island of Espiritu Santo in the New Hebrides Islands at the Espiritu Santo Naval Base.

History

World War II
The Seabees of the 40th Naval Construction Battalion arrived on Santo on 3 February 1943 and were tasked with building a third bomber field in dense jungle to the west of Luganville. Additional facilities constructed included a tank farm of six 1,000-barrel steel tanks, two truck-loading stations, two repair areas, fifteen  by  arch-rib warehouses, one  by  hangar, eighteen quonset huts for living quarters, six mess halls, and all necessary utilities.  of two-lane access and supply roads, were cut through dense jungle.

VP-44 operating PBY-5s operated from Luganville from 11 March 1944 until 15 June 1944 when it moved to Nissan Island.

VMF-323 was based at Luganville from 29 October 1944 until 23 February 1945 when it moved to Okinawa.

Postwar
NOB Espiritu Santo disestablished on 12 June 1946. The airfield remained in use as a civilian airstrip until the early 1970s however as it was on higher ground it was often clouded in and so it was decided to move all operations to the former Bomber Field No.2 which became Santo-Pekoa International Airport. The field is now largely overgrown with vegetation.

See also
Luganville Seaplane Base
Palikulo Bay Airfield
Santo International Airport
Turtle Bay Airfield

References

Airfields of the United States Navy
World War II airfields in the Pacific Ocean Theater
Airports in Vanuatu
Espiritu Santo
Military installations closed in 1944
1940s in the New Hebrides
1943 establishments in Oceania
1944 disestablishments in Oceania
Closed installations of the United States Navy